The 1973–74 FIBA Korać Cup was the third edition of FIBA's new competition, running from 6 November 1973 to 11 April 1974. It was contested by 37 teams, twenty-five more than in the previous edition.

Birra Forst Cantù defeated Partizan in the final to become the competition's first back-to-back champion.

Season teams

First round

|}

*Originally, AEK and 1.FC Bamberg were drawn to play against the Israeli teams Hapoel Tel Aviv and Maccabi Ramat Gan, respectively, but FIBA cancelled these match-ups and declared the former clubs winners.

**Soma Wien withdrew before the first leg and HAN Thessaloniki received a forfeit (2–0) in both games.

Second round

|}

Automatically qualified to round of 12
 Birra Forst Cantù (title holder)

Round of 12
The round of 12 were played with a round-robin system, in which every Two Game series (TGS) constituted as one game for the record.

Semi finals

|}

Finals

|}

References
Linguasport 1973–74 FIBA Korać Cup
1973–74 FIBA Korać Cup

1973 in basketball
1974 in basketball
FIBA Korać Cup